Andrew Maurice Pape (born 22 March 1962) is an English former professional footballer who played as a goalkeeper.

Career
Born in Hammersmith, Pape played club football in England and Denmark for Feltham, Queens Park Rangers, Charlton Athletic, Ikast FS, Crystal Palace, Harrow Borough, Enfield, Barnet, Woking, Dagenham & Redbridge, Sutton United and Aldershot Town.

At representative level, he won twelve caps for the England semi-professional team.

References

1962 births
Living people
Footballers from Hammersmith
English footballers
England semi-pro international footballers
Association football goalkeepers
Feltham F.C. (1946) players
Queens Park Rangers F.C. players
Charlton Athletic F.C. players
Ikast FS players
Crystal Palace F.C. players
Harrow Borough F.C. players
Enfield F.C. players
Barnet F.C. players
Woking F.C. players
Dagenham & Redbridge F.C. players
Sutton United F.C. players
Aldershot Town F.C. players
English Football League players